Kachhwa Road railway station is a small railway station in Mirzapur district, Uttar Pradesh. Its code is KWH. It serves Kachhwa city. The station consists of two platforms. The platform is not well sheltered. It lacks many facilities including water and sanitation.

Trains 
 Allahabad City–Manduadih (Morning) Passenger (unreserved)
 Allahabad City–Manduadih Passenger (unreserved)
 Allahabad City–Mau DEMU

References

Railway stations in Mirzapur district
Varanasi railway division